James Henry Manion (September 20, 1904 – July 11, 1978) was an American football player.

A native of Jasper, Minnesota, Manion played college football for St. Thomas. He later played professional football in the National Football League (NFL) as a guard for the Duluth Eskimos during the 1926 and 1927 seasons. He appeared in a total of 17 NFL games, 12 of them as a starter.

References

1904 births
1978 deaths
Duluth Eskimos players
Players of American football from Minnesota
American football guards
St. Thomas (Minnesota) Tommies football players